Trompsburg is a town in the Free State province of South Africa off the N1 highway, the major road connection between Johannesburg and Cape Town.

Background 
The town is 120 km south-west of Bloemfontein and 56 km north-east of Philippolis. It was laid out in 1891 on the farm Middelwater and attained municipal status in 1902. Named after the owners of the farm, Jan and Bastiaan Tromp. It was at first called Jagersfontein Road, then Hamilton, in honour of Sir Hamilton John Goold-Adams (1858–1920), Lieutenant-Governor of the Orange River Colony from 1901 to 1910.

References

Populated places in the Kopanong Local Municipality
Populated places established in 1891
1891 establishments in South Africa